Sicini is a tribe of flies from the family Conopidae.

Genera
Sicus Scopoli, 1763

References

Conopidae
Brachycera tribes
Taxa named by Pierre André Latreille